Amy Prieto is a Professor of Chemistry at Colorado State University and the Founder and Chief Technical Officer of Prieto Battery.

Education and early career 
Prieto received her Bachelor of Arts degree in Chemistry and Philosophy from Williams College in 1996. There, she undertook an honors thesis entitled "The Synthesis and Characterization of Precursors to Zirconium-Containing Liquid Crystals" under the mentorship of Lee Young Park. Before beginning her doctoral work, she was a summer research fellow at Bell Labs, which she credits with fostering an appreciation for cross-disciplinary collaboration. She then attended the University of California, Berkeley, where she received her PhD in Inorganic Chemistry in 2001. For her graduate work, she worked in the laboratory of Angelica Stacy on her thesis entitled Electrodeposition of Nanostructured Thermoelectric Materials working to synthesize solid-state materials.

Following her PhD, she began a postdoctoral fellowship at Harvard University, working in the Nanoscale Science and Engineering Center in Hongkun Park's research group, where she studied and characterized the electronic properties of single molecules and nanoparticles.

Research & Prieto Battery 
In 2005, Prieto joined the faculty at Colorado State University as a synthetic chemist and materials scientist. Prieto's research program focuses on Lithium-ion batteries, as well as developing nanoparticles and nanowire structures for a variety of applications.

In 2009, she founded Prieto Battery. The company is geared towards developing and commercializing a solid-state rechargeable battery that will last longer, charge faster, and be free of toxic or flammable materials that make up traditional batteries. She had conceived of the company upon arriving at Colorado State University, and it took her four years to form the company and an additional five to develop a working prototype. By 2014, Prieto and collaborators had created a small pilot production line in her laboratory at CSU to demonstrate their viability to larger investors.

Unlike traditional batteries, Prieto's battery is a solid-state battery, meaning the battery uses solid electrodes and a solid electrolyte, rather than liquid or polymer gel electrolytes. The battery makes use of a three-dimensional copper foam that undergoes a coating process through two electroplating (using an electric current to coat a piece of metal with more metal) steps: one to create a positively charged electrode (anode made of copper antimonide) and one to create the negatively-charged electrode (cathode). Because the foam is a porous material, the electroplating process coats both the foam's outer surface and its pores, creating a high surface area for ion transfer, making Prieto's battery charge faster and store more energy than traditional lithium-ion batteries. The batteries also have the advantage of being lightweight, flexible, can come in a variety of shapes, and don't overheat.

Several large companies have invested in Prieto Battery, including Stanley Ventures and Intel Capital, working to bring the batteries to market. In 2016, Prieto demonstrated that her batteries work to Stanley Black & Decker, using one of their 3D printers.

Awards and honors 

 Fellow, Royal Society of Chemistry, 2017
 Presidential Early Career Award for Scientists and Engineers, 2012
 National Science Foundation CAREER Awards, 2010
 L'Oréal USA for Women in Science Fellowship, 2004
 Fellow, Sigma Xi, 1996

Selected publications 

 SC Riha, BA Parkinson, and AL Prieto (2009) Solution-Based Synthesis and Characterization of Cu2ZnSnS4 Nanocrystals. J. Am. Chem. Soc. 131, 34, 12054–12055. https://doi.org/10.1021/ja9044168
 MS Sander, AL Prieto, R Gronsky, T Sands, AM Stacy (2002) Fabrication of High-Density, High Aspect Ratio, Large-Area Bismuth Telluride Nanowire Arrays by Electrodeposition into Porous Anodic Alumina Templates. Advanced Materials. 14 (9), 665–667. https://doi.org/10.1002/1521-4095(20020503)14:9<665::AID-ADMA665>3.0.CO;2-B
 AL Prieto, MS Sander, MS Martín-González, R Gronsky, T Sands, Angelica M. Stacy (2001) Electrodeposition of Ordered Bi2Te3 Nanowire Arrays. J. Am. Chem. Soc. 123, 29, 7160–7161. https://doi.org/10.1021/ja015989j
 TS Arthur, DJ Bates, N Cirigliano, DC Johnson, P Malati, JM Mosby, E Perre, MT Rawls, AL Prieto, B Dunn (2011) Three-dimensional electrodes and battery architectures. MRS Bulletin, 36(7), 523–531. https://doi.org/10.1557/mrs.2011.156

References 

Year of birth missing (living people)
Williams College alumni
University of California, Berkeley alumni
Colorado State University faculty
Colombian scientists
American women chemists
Colombian chemists
Living people
American women academics
21st-century American women